The following is a list of ecoregions in the United States  as identified by the World Wide Fund for Nature (WWF). The United States is a megadiverse country with a high level of endemism across a wide variety of ecosystems.

Terrestrial ecoregions
The United States is unique among countries in that its terrestrial ecoregions span three biogeographic realms: the Nearctic, Neotropical, and Oceanian realms.

50 states
Alaska is the most biodiverse state with 15 ecoregions across 3 biomes in the same realm. California comes in a close second with 13 ecoregions across 4 biomes in the same realm. By contrast, Rhode Island is the least biodiverse with just one ecoregion - the Northeastern coastal forests - encompassing the entire state.

The terrestrial ecoregions of the 50 states of the United States are as follows:

5 inhabited territories
The ecoregions of the 5 inhabited territories of the United States are as follows:

Marine ecoregions
The marine ecoregions of the 50 states of the United States are as follows:

See also
Alternative classification framework
List of ecoregions in the United States (EPA)
WWF ecoregions of neighboring countries
List of ecoregions in Canada (WWF)
List of ecoregions in Mexico (WWF)

References

 Ricketts, Taylor H; Eric Dinerstein; David M. Olson; Colby J. Loucks; et al. (1999). Terrestrial Ecoregions of North America: a Conservation Assessment. Island Press; Washington, DC.

 WWF
United States, WWF
Ecoregions, WWF
Ecoregions, WWF
Natural history of the United States
Ecoregions WWF
United States WWF
United States WWF
United States